Zog BogBean – From the Marcy Playground, was an album, self-produced and recorded by John Wozniak in his bedroom studio with some help from his then-girlfriend Sherry Fraser and her brother, Scott. A small run of CDs were self-released by Wozniak, and they remain extremely difficult to find to this day. "Our Generation" and "Dog And His Master" would appear on later Marcy Playground albums.

As of April 2009, Zog Bogbean is available for download at Marcy Playground's official site as well as other outlets such as iTunes.

Track list

Personnel

John Wozniak
Sherry Fraser (Here Comes Summer, People are People)
Scott Fraser (drums) 
Dylan Keefe (Bass)

References

External links
Official Myspace Page
Official Website
Official Facebook

1990 debut albums
Albums recorded in a home studio
Self-released albums